Phuwadol Suwannachart (born June 20, 1982), is a Thai retired professional footballer who played as a striker.

International career

In November 2013, he debuted for Thailand playing against Iran in the 2015 AFC Asian Cup qualification; he received a red card in the following game.

International

Honours

Club
TOT S.C.
 Provincial League: 2006

Individual
 Thai Division 1 League top scorer: 2011

References

External links
 Profile at Goal

Living people
1982 births
Phuwadol Suwannachart
Phuwadol Suwannachart
Association football forwards
Phuwadol Suwannachart
Phuwadol Suwannachart
Phuwadol Suwannachart
Phuwadol Suwannachart
Phuwadol Suwannachart
Phuwadol Suwannachart
Phuwadol Suwannachart
Phuwadol Suwannachart
Phuwadol Suwannachart
Phuwadol Suwannachart